Henry Cecil Gunning, FRSC (September 9, 1901 – 1991) was a Canadian geologist and academic. A mineral, gunningite, was named in his honour.

Early life
Gunning was born in Belfast, Ireland. At the age of six his family moved to Vancouver, British Columbia. His father established a hardware business there.

Gunning earned a B.A.Sc. in Geological Engineering in 1924-25 from the University of British Columbia. He was one of the first two graduates from the UBC Geological Engineering program, started in 1921
. While at university he played on the rugby and soccer teams. After graduating he worked one summer as a contract miner in Stewart, British Columbia, before moving to Cambridge, Massachusetts to study at the Massachusetts Institute of Technology. By 1927 Gunning had earned his PhD.  In 1928, he married Edith Frances Fitts.

Career
After school, Dr. Gunning started working with the Geological Survey of Canada. He concentrated on survey in the geology and mineral deposits of British Columbia, with a focus on Vancouver Island. He also surveyed part of Quebec.

In 1939, he began his academic career with the University of British Columbia. As Head of the Department of Geology and Geography he both taught and performed research. In 1953, Gunning was promoted to the position of Dean of the Faculty of Applied Science. While he was Dean he also served as Director of the Geological Engineering Program. He surrendered that position in 1959 to travel to Rhodesia, Africa and conduct research. 
Dr. Gunning returned to Vancouver to practice private consulting and also to establish an engineering program at the British Columbia Institute of Technology.

Awards and honours
1937, awarded Barlow Memorial Medal by the Canadian Institute of Mining, Metallurgy and Petroleum  for his paper, Cadillac-Malartic Area, Quebec
1956, awarded an Honorary Doctor of Science Degree from UBC
1966, awarded Logan Medal from the Geological Association of Canada
made a Fellow of the Royal Society of Canada 
Mineral named in his honour, Gunningite

Often cited papers
Gunning, H.C. (1930): Geology and Mineral Deposits of Quatsino-Nimpkish Area, Vancouver Island, British Columbia; in Summary Report 1929; Geological Survey of Canada, Part A, pages 94A-143A.
Gunning, H.C. (1932): Preliminary Report on the Nimpkish Lake Quadrangle, Vancouver Island, British Columbia; in Summary Report 1931; Geological Survey of Canada, Part A, pages 22–35.

References

External links
 History of UBC Engineering Geology
 UBC Tribute
 Barlow Memorial Medal
 Gunningite

1901 births
1991 deaths
20th-century Canadian geologists
Geological Survey of Canada personnel
Fellows of the Royal Society of Canada
Academic staff of the British Columbia Institute of Technology
University of British Columbia alumni
Massachusetts Institute of Technology alumni
Academic staff of the University of British Columbia
Logan Medal recipients
Irish emigrants to Canada (before 1923)
Canadian expatriates in the United States